Schönau an der Triesting is a town in the district of Baden in Lower Austria in Austria.

Population

References

Further reading
John A. Rice: The Temple of Night at Schönau, architecture, music, and theater in a late eighteenth-century Viennese garden. Philadelphia, PA ; American Philosophical Society (2006)

Cities and towns in Baden District, Austria